Windfall is a former unincorporated community and ghost town in the northwest portion of central Alberta, Canada within Woodlands County.

History 
Windfall was founded by Canadian Fina Oil Ltd. shortly after the company drilled a well and discovered gas in the Windfall field in March 1955. As a result of this discovery, and discoveries in two nearby fields by two other companies, the company developed a pilot project plant to recover gas, sulphur, and hydrocarbons from the three fields through an interlocking recovery process.

Infrastructure included water, wastewater, gas, and power utilities, as well as roads, sidewalks, and streetlights.

Due to the success of the pilot project plant, a larger plant was built by the Pan American Petroleum Corporation. It opened in April 1962 and was named the West Whitecourt Plant. A bridge over the Athabasca River, between Windfall and Highway 43, was built in time for the opening of the plant. As a result, the up to four-hour commute from Whitecourt was reduced to a  commute. An extension of the Canadian National rail line from Whitecourt to Windfall was completed later that year in November 1962.

By 1966, the population of Windfall declined to 78.

To this date, directional signs along Highway 43 approaching its intersection with Township Road 604 still indicate the presence of Windfall.

See also 
List of communities in Alberta
List of ghost towns in Alberta

References 

Ghost towns in Alberta
Localities in Woodlands County